Bacab is the generic Yucatec Maya name for the four prehispanic aged deities of the interior of the earth and its water deposits. The Bacabs have more recent counterparts in the lecherous, drunken old thunder deities of the Gulf Coast regions. The Bacabs are also referred to as Pauahtuns.

Yucatec traditions

Myth
The Bacabs "were four brothers whom God placed, when he created the world, at the four points of it, holding up the sky so that it should not fall. [...] They escaped when the world was destroyed by the deluge." Their names were Hobnil, Cantzicnal, Saccimi, and Hosanek. 

The Bacabs played an important role in the cosmological upheaval associated with Katun 11 Ahau, when Oxlahuntiku 'Thirteen-god' was humbled by Bolontiku 'Nine-god'. According to the Book of Chilam Balam of Chumayel, "then the sky would fall, it would fall down, it would fall down upon the earth, when the four gods, the four Bacabs, were set up, who brought about the destruction of the world."

According to Francisco Hernández (quoted by Las Casas and Diego López de Cogolludo), the Bacab (apparently a unitary concept) was the son of the creator god, Itzamna, and of the goddess Ixchebelyax; he had once been humbled, killed, and revived.

Ritual
The veneration of the Bacabs was closely connected to that of the so-called Year Bearers and their prognostics. Each Bacab ruled one of the directions and the associated Year Bearer day (one of four New Year days), as follows:

The Bacabs were invoked in connection with rain and agriculture, since they were intimately associated with the four Chaacs, or rain deities, and the Pauahtuns, or wind deities, all located in the four directions. The Maya of Chan Kom referred to the four skybearers as the four Chacs (Redfield and Villa Rojas).
 
Since they were Year Bearer patrons, and also because of their meteorological qualities, the Bacabs were important in divination ceremonies; they were approached with questions about crops, weather, or the health of bees (Landa). 

In addition, the "Four Gods, Four Bacabs" were often invoked in curing rituals that had the four-cornered world and its beaches for a theatre, which is the basic reason why the most important early-colonial collection of Yucatec curing texts, the Ritual of the Bacabs, has been named after them.

Gulf Coast traditions
Of the 'Grandfathers' of the Gulf Coast corresponding to the Bacabs, the most powerful one is responsible for opening the rainy season. The four earth-carrying old men are sometimes conceived as drowned ancestors who are serving for one year; then, other drowned men are substituted for them. Together with this comes the concept that the powerful 'Grandfather' only grows old over the course of the year.

Earlier representations
In earlier representations (which are not restricted to the Yucatán), the Bacabs who carry the sky are represented by old men carrying the sky-dragon. They can have the attributes of a conch, a turtle, a snail, a spider web, or a bee 'armour'. In the rain almanacs of the Post-Classic Dresden Codex, the old man with the conch and the turtle is put on a par with Chaac. This old man corresponds to god N in the Schellhas-Zimmermann-Taube classification, a god of thunder, mountains, and the interior of the earth . 

In Classic Maya iconography, the Bacab occurs in various stereotypical situations: 
Fourfold, the Bacabs are repeatedly shown carrying the slab of a throne or the roof of a building. In this, young, princely impersonators can substitute for them (see fig.), a fact reminiscent of the drowned ancestors serving as earth-carriers mentioned above. On a damaged relief panel from Pomona, four of these young Bacab impersonators appear to have held the four Classic Year Bearer days in their hands.
A Bacab inhabiting a turtle (perhaps representing the earth) is part of the scenes with the resurrection of the Maya maize god.
Still unexplained is a recurring scene depicted on Chama vases, in which a young man holds the Bacab, half-hidden in his conch, by the wrist, apparently to sacrifice him with a knife.

The Bacab has a peculiar netted element as a distinguishing attribute serving as a headdress, which might conceivably belong to the sphere of the hunt or of beekeeping. It recurs as a superfix in his hieroglyphical names; its reading is uncertain. Hieroglyphically, one finds conflations of Itzamna (god D) and Bacab (god N), recalling the mythological filiation of the Bacab mentioned above.

See also
Four Heavenly Kings
Lokapala
Four sons of Horus
Titan (mythology)
Guardians of the directions
Anemoi
Four Dwarves (Norse mythology)
Four Stags (Norse mythology)

References

Citations

Sources 

 Robert Redfield and Alfonso Villa Rojas,Chan Kom. Chicago University Press.
 Ralph L. Roys, The Book of Chilam Balam of Chumayel. Norman: University of Oklahoma Press.
 Ralph L. Roys, Ritual of the Bacabs. Norman: University of Oklahoma Press.
 David Stuart, New Year Records in Classic Maya Inscriptions, The PARI Journal 5(2):1-6. Fall 2004.
 Karl Taube, The Major Gods of Ancient Yucatan.
 J.E.S. Thompson, The Bacabs: Their Portraits and Their Glyphs.
 A.M. Tozzer, Landa's Relación de las Cosas de Yucatan. A Translation. 

Maya deities